Joshua Toole is an Ireland international rugby league footballer who plays as a centre for the Forbes Magpies in the Group 11 Premiership.

Background
Toole was born in Bathurst, New South Wales, Australia.

Playing career
He has also previously played for the Illawarra Cutters, a feeder team for St. George Illawarra Dragons, and the Mount Pritchard Mounties. Toole was part of the Ireland squad at the 2013 Rugby League World Cup., as well as in the 2012 and 2014 European Cup competitions. He played in Ireland's first match against France, and won himself the Man of the Match award.

In 2018, the centre moved to England to sign for Sheffield, and join up with his former coach at Ireland Mark Aston.

Toole holds an Irish passport despite being born in Australia.

References

External links

Sheffield Eagles profile

1989 births
Living people
Australian people of Irish descent
Australian rugby league players
Australian expatriate sportspeople in England
Ireland national rugby league team players
Illawarra Cutters players
Mount Pritchard Mounties players
Rugby league players from Bathurst, New South Wales
Rugby league wingers